Martina Dwamena, who goes by the mononym Asantewaa is a Ghanaian TikToker. She is known for her funny videos she started creating during the global Coronavirus pandemic.

Career 
Asantewaa's career as a TikTok and social media influencer started in 2020 during the Coronavirus pandemic and the world was on lockdown.

She was awarded the TikTok influencer of the year at the Pulse Ghana Influencer Awards 2021.

References 

Living people
Ghanaian internet celebrities
TikTokers
Year of birth missing (living people)